Daisy Hill is an unincorporated community in Polk Township, Washington County, in the U.S. state of Indiana.

History
According to tradition, Daisy Hill was so named on account of there being a cemetery near the town site.

Daisy Hill was mostly destroyed by a powerful tornado in the 1974 Super Outbreak. This tornado was rated F5 and completely leveled farms in the Daisy Hill area.

Geography

References

Unincorporated communities in Indiana
Unincorporated communities in Washington County, Indiana